KRLQ (94.1 FM, "Q 94.1") is a radio station broadcasting a classic country music format. Licensed to Hodge, Louisiana, United States, the station serves Ruston, Jonesboro, Minden, and the surrounding areas.  The station is currently owned by William W. Brown, through licensee North Louisiana Broadcasting, Inc.

The station is an affiliate of the New Orleans Saints radio network.

History
KRLQ's frequency and ability to build a station was won by William Brown in FCC auction 62 held in 2006. The station became licensed in late 2007.

The station's power was upgraded from 35,000 watts to 47,000 watts as of February 8, 2008.

Technical specifications
Station antenna is an Electronics Research Inc. LPX-10C 10-bay full wavelength spaced providing 5.680 db of gain.

References

External links

Country radio stations in the United States
Jackson Parish, Louisiana
Radio stations in Louisiana
Radio stations established in 2008
Mass media in Ruston, Louisiana